Michael Raynor may refer to:
 Michael E. Raynor (born 1967), Canadian writer and expert on business management practices
 Michael A. Raynor (born 1962), American diplomat
 Michael Raynor (actor), American actor, director and writer